Gibbs House may refer to:

 Gibbs House (Gainesville, Alabama), listed on the NRHP in Sumter County, Alabama
 William and Caroline Gibbs House, Maywood, Illinois, listed on the NRHP in Cook County, Illinois
 E.H. Gibbs House, Oskaloosa, Iowa, listed on the NRHP in Mahaska County, Iowa
 John Gibbs House (Pilotview, Kentucky), listed on the NRHP in Clark County, Kentucky
 Paul Gibbs House, Framingham, Massachusetts, NRHP-listed
 William Gibbs House, Waltham, Massachusetts, NRHP-listed
 John Gibbs House (Kalamazoo, Michigan), listed on the NRHP in Michigan
 Heman Gibbs Farmstead, Falcon Heights, Minnesota, listed on the NRHP in Minnesota
 Gibbs-Von Seutter House, Raymond, Mississippi, listed on the NRHP in Hinds County, Mississippi
 Gibbs House (Lockport, New York), listed on the NRHP in New York
 Gibbs House (Beaufort, North Carolina), listed on the NRHP in Carteret County, North Carolina
 Nicholas Gibbs House, Knoxville, Tennessee, listed on the NRHP in Knox County, Tennessee
 Gibbs-Flournoy House, Manning, Texas, listed on the NRHP in Angelina County, Texas
 Gibbs-Thomas House, Salt Lake City, Utah, listed on the NRHP in Salt Lake City, Utah
 Gibbs House (Seattle, Washington), a listed landmark in Seattle

See also

 
 
 William Gibbs McAdoo House, Marietta, Georgia, USA
 John Gibbs House (disambiguation)
 Gibbes House (disambiguation)
 Gibbs (disambiguation)